The 2019 Open Sud de France was a tennis tournament played on indoor hard courts. It was the 32nd edition of the event, and part of the ATP Tour 250 Series of the 2019 ATP Tour. It took place at the Arena Montpellier in Montpellier, France, from February 4 to February 10, 2019.

Singles main-draw entrants

Seeds 

 1 Rankings are as of January 28, 2019.

Other entrants 
The following players received wildcards into the singles main draw:
  Ugo Humbert
  Denis Shapovalov
  Jo-Wilfried Tsonga

The following player received entry using a protected ranking into the singles main draw:
  Steve Darcis

The following players received entry from the qualifying draw:
  Matthias Bachinger
  Marcos Baghdatis
  Antoine Hoang
  Nicolas Mahut

The following players received entry as lucky losers:
  Ruben Bemelmans
  Adrián Menéndez Maceiras

Withdrawals
  Richard Gasquet → replaced by  Ivo Karlović
  Peter Gojowczyk → replaced by  Thomas Fabbiano
  Vasek Pospisil → replaced by  Evgeny Donskoy
  Cedrik-Marcel Stebe → replaced by  Radu Albot
  Jiří Veselý → replaced by  Ruben Bemelmans
  Mischa Zverev → replaced by  Adrián Menéndez Maceiras

ATP doubles main-draw entrants

Seeds 

1 Rankings as of January 28, 2019.

Other entrants 
The following pairs received wildcards into the doubles main draw:
  Benjamin Bonzi /  Antoine Hoang
  Constant Lestienne /  Lucas Pouille

Finals

Singles 

  Jo-Wilfried Tsonga defeated  Pierre-Hugues Herbert, 6–4, 6–2

Doubles 

  Ivan Dodig /  Édouard Roger-Vasselin defeated  Benjamin Bonzi /  Antoine Hoang, 6–3, 6–3

References

External links